Touch is the second studio album by Australian rock band Noiseworks. It was released by CBS Records on 14 November 1988.

The album debuted at No. 5 on the Australian Recording Industry Association (ARIA) Albums Chart. The album was produced by Chris Kimsey (The Rolling Stones) and Noiseworks. The title track preceded it as the first single, peaking at No. 12 on the ARIA Singles Chart. Subsequent singles "Voice of Reason", "Simple Man" and "In My Youth" failed to make the Top 40 (despite the latter receiving considerable radio airplay). Nevertheless, Noiseworks became at the time one of Australia's most popular live rock acts.

Track listing

Personnel
 Steve Balbi – bass, vocals
 Kevin Nicol – drums
 Stuart Fraser – guitar, vocals
 Justin Stanley – keyboards, harp, vocals
 Jon Stevens – vocals

Production
 Chris Kimsey – producer
 David Price – engineer

Charts

Weekly charts

Year-end charts

Certifications

References

1988 albums
Noiseworks albums